Beer7 is a Ska punk band from Be'er Sheva, Israel. The name is a shortened version of the city's name – Sheva is Hebrew for seven. The band was formed in 2001, and recorded its first album in 2003. The album Skandal was distributed by an indie label named "Ra records". It was sold out and later uploaded online.

Beer7 performs all over Israel, in punk festivals, clubs and pubs. They performed with Israeli bands Useless ID, Sartan HaShad, Kuku Bloff veHayetushim, Beat 69, and the Australian band Yidcore.

Beer7's music video for the Operation Ivy tribute The Radio's Not a Friend reached 1st place on the Israeli music video channel, Music 24.

The band's currently recording their second album, "Birat Ha'Negev".

Line-up 
 Dafna Arad – vocals
 Dudu Rosen – guitar
 Alon Ziv  – bass
 Guy Drory – drums
 Oded Ben Itzhak – saxophone

Former members
 Raz Lahav – bass
 Michael Lupu – bass

Beer7 in the Israeli punk scene 
There were few women on stage in Israeli punk rock shows before Beer7's Dafna Arad. This started a whole girl scene that includes bands like Va'adat Kishut, Phoney Pony, and CUBAN B, all girl-fronted.

Discography

Skandal (2003)

No Space (2010)

References

External links 
Beer7 on MySpace Music

Israeli punk rock groups
Musical groups established in 2002
2002 establishments in Israel
Music in Beersheba
Ska groups